Nils Vinberg (born 18 June 1957) is a Swedish luger. He competed in the men's singles and doubles events at the 1976 Winter Olympics.

References

1957 births
Living people
Swedish male lugers
Olympic lugers of Sweden
Lugers at the 1976 Winter Olympics
Sportspeople from Stockholm